Kadammanitta is a village in Pathanamthitta District, Kerala, India which is famous for Padayani.

See also 
 Padayani
 Vazhamuttom
 Thazhoor Bhagavathy Kshetram
 kadammanittapally

References 

Villages in Pathanamthitta district